Robin Hood Cycle Co Ltd bicycles is an English manufacturer made in Nottingham England. Acquired by the Raleigh Bicycle Company in 1906 many of whose bicycles were imported into the United States.  Best known for their three-speeds, they were an economy line for Raleigh.  They also imported racing bikes as the Lenton Sports.

References

Cycle manufacturers of the United Kingdom
Manufacturing companies based in Nottingham